Olearia ramulosa, commonly known as twiggy daisy-bush, is a species of flowering plant in the family Asteraceae and is endemic to south-eastern Australia. It is a shrub with narrowly elliptic, linear or narrowly egg-shaped leaves, and pale blue, mauve or white and yellow, daisy-like inflorescences.

Description
The upper surface of the leaf is covered with minute pimples and the lower surface is covered with grey, woolly hairs. Each head has 2 to 13 pale blue, mauve or white ray florets surrounding 3 to 13 yellow disc florets. Flowering occurs from October to May and the fruit is a silky-hairy achene, the pappus with 22 to 41 bristles.

Taxonomy
Jacques Labillardière described the twiggy daisy bush as Aster ramulosus in 1806, in volume 2 of his Novae Hollandiae Plantarum Specimen, from material collected in Tasmania.

In 1867, George Bentham changed the name to Olearia ramulosus in Flora Australiensis.The specific epithet (ramulosus) means "bearing branches".

Other botanists gave the species other names, but the name accepted by the Australian Plant Census is Olearia ramulosa. Those other botanists included German botanist Christian Gottfried Daniel Nees von Esenbeck who changed Labillardière's Aster ramulosus to Diplostephium ramulosum in 1832, and Swiss botanist Augustin Pyramus de Candolle who changed Labillardière's name to Eurybia ramulosa in 1836.

Alternative common names are oily bush and water cypress.

Distribution and habitat
Olearia ramulosa grows in forest, woodland and scrub, and is widespread and common from south-eastern Queensland, through New South Wales, the Australian Capital Territory and eastern Victoria to south-eastern South Australia and Tasmania.

Ecology
The plant is eaten by caterpillars of the moth species Amelora milvaria. Bees, beetles, and less commonly flies and wasps have been recorded visiting flowers in a Tasmanian field study.

Use in horticulture
Olearia ramulosa can be propagated by seeds or cuttings of new growth that has hardened. It can be grown in dry or temperate climates and is frost-hardy in sunny or part-shaded spots. Pruning can invigorate it and it can be grown as a low hedge.

References

Asterales of Australia
Flora of New South Wales
Flora of Tasmania
Flora of Queensland
Flora of the Australian Capital Territory
Flora of Victoria (Australia)
ramulosa
Plants described in 1806
Taxa named by Jacques Labillardière